Aoupinieta hollowayi is a species of moth of the family Tortricidae. It is found in New Caledonia.

The ground colour of the forewings is dark yellow with orange reticulation and sprinkling and brown markings with indistinct violet admixture. The hindwings are cream. Adults have been recorded on wing in May, July and August.

Etymology
The species is named for Dr J.D. Holloway, who first collected the species.

References

External links

Moths described in 2012
Endemic fauna of New Caledonia
Archipini
Taxa named by Józef Razowski